Edward Joseph Cunningham (born 26 November 19372 November 2003) was an Australian politician.

Cunningham was born in Clayfield in Brisbane and arrived in Western Australia in 1971. Before entering politics he was a marketing manager and public servant. In 1988 he was elected to the Western Australian Legislative Assembly in a by-election as the Labor member for Balga; he moved to the new seat of Marangaroo in 1989 and to Girrawheen in 1996. Although he never held a front bench position, he was President of the Parliamentary Labor Party from 1994 to 1997 and Opposition Whip from 1997 to 2001, when he retired.

Cunningham died on 2 November 2003 at the age of 65 after a short illness.

References

1937 births
2003 deaths
Members of the Western Australian Legislative Assembly
Australian Labor Party members of the Parliament of Western Australia
21st-century Australian politicians